Amatasi 27 is a James Wharram designed fishing catamaran. It is inspired by the traditional amatasi vessels of Samoa, and has been described as a "pioneering environmentally friendly fishing boat".

Awards
Amatasi 27 was designed for the 2010 Design Competition in Classic Boat magazine. The brief was for a fishing boat under  that would not need a licence for fishing under sail or oar. Amatasi 27 won first prize.

See also
 List of multihulls

References

External links
Study plans at Wharram designs

Catamarans